The 1887 Scottish Cup Final was the 14th final of the Scottish Cup and the final of the 1886–87 Scottish Cup, the most prestigious knockout football competition in Scotland. The match was played at the second Hampden Park in Crosshill (today part of Glasgow) on 12 February 1887 and was watched by a crowd of 15,000 spectators. The final was contested by the 1883 winners Dumbarton and Hibernian who had never won the competition before.

This was only the third Scottish Cup final not to feature a team from Glasgow after the 1883 and 1885 finals.

Background
Dumbarton had reached the final on three previous occasions losing after a replay twice to Queen's Park in 1881 and 1882 before beating Vale of Leven after a replay to lift the trophy in 1883.

Hibernian had been relatively successful in the Scottish Cup after reaching the fifth round on their first appearance in 1877–78. Their best performance prior to 1886–87 had come in the three previous seasons when they were knocked in the semi-finals. No team from Edinburgh – or indeed the East of Scotland – had previously reached the final.

The two teams had been drawn to face each other on three previous occasions. Dumbarton beat Hibernian 6–2 three times – although one was successfully protested – in 1879–80 and 1881–82 before Hibernian came out on top after a replay in 1885–86.

Route to the final

Hibernian

Dumbarton

Notes

Match details

References

Scottish Cup Finals
Scottish Cup Final 1887
Scottish Cup Final 1887
Cup
19th century in Glasgow
February 1887 sports events